The Siamese–Vietnamese War of 1841–1845 was a military conflict between the Đại Nam, ruled by Emperor Thiệu Trị, and the Kingdom of Siam, under the rule of Chakkri King Nangklao. The rivalry between Vietnam and Siam over the control of the Cambodian heartlands in the Lower Mekong basin had intensified after Siam had attempted to conquer Cambodia during the previous Siamese–Vietnamese War (1831–1834). Vietnamese Emperor Minh Mạng installed Princess Ang Mey to rule Cambodia as a puppet queen regnant of his choice in 1834 and declared full suzerainty over Cambodia, which he demoted to Vietnam's 32nd province, the Western Commandery (Tây Thành Province). In 1841, Siam seized the opportunity of discontent to aid the Khmer revolt against Vietnamese rule. King Rama III sent an army to enforce Prince Ang Duong's installation as King of Cambodia. After four years of attrition warfare, both parties agreed to compromise and placed Cambodia under joint rule.

Background

The once-powerful Khmer Kingdom during the 18th century became increasingly influenced by its eastern and western neighbors: Vietnam and Siam. During the reign of the youthful Khmer king Ang Eng (1779–96) Siam conquered Cambodia's Battambang and Siem Reap Provinces in the west. The provincial administrators became vassals, under direct Siamese rule.

In the early 17th century, Siam first adopted the tradition to take members of the Cambodian royal family hostage and took them to the court at Ayutthaya, where they were left to be influenced and to compromise each other under Siamese scrutiny. The Vietnamese court in Huế also established those methods and skillfully orchestrated their protégés and interfered in marriage policies. Quarrels among the royal contenders greatly diminished any chances of restoring an effective Cambodian kingship for many decades.

After Siam's defeat in the Siamese–Vietnamese War (1831–1834), the Vietnamese reinstalled King Ang Chan to the Cambodian throne. Prince Ang Em, who had been a Siamese hostage, was made the governor of Battambang by Chao Phraya Bodindecha (Battambang and Siem Reap had been under direct rule of Siam since 1794). However, King Ang Chan died in January 1834 and left four daughters but no male heir. In 1834, Emperor Minh Mạng chose Princess Ang Mey to rule Cambodia as a queen regnant with the title Quận chúa (郡主). However, Queen Ang Mey was only a puppet queen without royal powers, as Minh Mạng incorporated Cambodia into the Vietnamese Empire as Tây Thành Province. The Vietnamese administration of Cambodia was bestowed to Trương Minh Giảng, who was appointed as viceroy. The province's government was based in Phnom Penh.

Emperor Minh Mạng had decreed elaborate plans and designs for cultural, economic, and ethnic development and the assimilation of Cambodia and forwarded them to Trương Minh Giảng. However, the economic and societal realities of Cambodia frustrated all efforts, and hardly any progress had been made in more than a decade.

Prince Ang Em, the governor of Battambang, resolved to take actions against the humiliating reign of Queen Ang Mey. In December 1838, Ang Em defected from Siamese tutelage to Vietnam and arrived in Phnom Penh in the hope that Trương Minh Giảng would make him king. Trương, however, arrested Ang Em and sent him to Huế. Siamese General Chaophraya Bodindecha marched from Bangkok to Battambang in 1839 to alleviate the situation. In 1840, Minh Mạng ordered the demotion of Queen Ang Mey and her sisters, depriving them of their status. High-ranking Cambodian ministers, including Chauvea Tolaha Long, were deported to Huế where they were later exiled to Northern Vietnam. Princess Ang Baen, elder sister of Ang Mey, whose mother was a pro-Siamese queen, was caught collaborating with the Siamese at Battambang and was executed by drowning at Long Hồ. Ang Mey and other princesses were subsequently exiled to Poulo Condore. These events, combined with Vietnamese suppressions, led the Cambodians to rise against Vietnamese rule in open rebellion. Oknha Surkealok the governor of Pursat met Bodindecha in November 1840, urging for Siamese armies to expel the Vietnamese, who held garrisons in all of the notable settlements in Cambodia and presenting a formal petition to King Rama III to release Ang Duong to be the new Cambodian king. Siam then endorsed Prince Ang Duong, Ang Em's younger brother, as the new candidate for the Cambodian throne.

Military campaigns

Siamese offensives of 1840–1842

In November 1840, the Siamese warlord Chaophraya Bodindecha sent troops led by his son Phra Phromborrirak and his brother-in-law Chao Phraya Nakhon Ratchasima Thongin from Sisophon to lay siege on Pursat, which was held by Vietnamese forces. The Siege of Pursat was a success, as the Siamese army moved south to attack Phnom Penh.

Bodindecha also sent forces, led by Phraya Ratchanikul, to take Kampong Svay, which was occupied by Đoàn Văn Sách. The Siamese took Kampong Svay but were defeated by Trương Minh Giảng at the Battle of Chikraeng. Phraya Ratchanikul's army was cut off and had to retreat with heavy losses. Bodindecha then negotiated a peaceful surrender with Võ Đức Trung the military commander of Pursat on December 31, 1840, before Trương Minh Giảng could reach him.

Emperor Minh Mạng, who had sent reinforcements under Phạm Văn Điển, died after a fall from a horse in February 1841. The new emperor, Thiệu Trị, reversed Vietnamese policies on Cambodia and ordered the retreat of all Vietnamese forces. By October 1841, the Vietnamese had retreated to An Giang Province. Viceroy Trương Minh Giảng evacuated Phnom Penh, retreating to Châu Đốc. Eventually, Trương Minh Giảng committed suicide to take responsibility for the loss of Cambodia.

The Vietnamese had taken the defected Prince Ang Em to An Giang to rally Cambodian support. However, Bodindecha was now unopposed and sent his son Phra Phromborrirak to help Prince Ang Duong to the throne in Oudong and to massacre all remaining Vietnamese people still dispersed in Cambodia.

Siamese assault on Hà Tiên 
After Siamese dominance was established in Cambodia, King Rama III ordered the Vĩnh Tế Canal at the Cambodian-Vietnamese border, which enabled Vietnamese naval forces to access the Gulf of Thailand quickly. Bodindecha reminded the king that the canal was guarded by strong Vietnamese forces in Hà Tiên and An Giang. More troops were required to attack the area. The king thus sent his half-brother Prince Isaret (later Viceroy Pinklao), accompanied by Chuang Bunnag (son of Phraklang, later Somdet Chao Phraya Sri Suriyawongse) and five brigantines to attack Hà Tiên (Banteay Meas) and a land force, led by Chao Phraya Yommaraj Bunnak and Prince Ang Duong, to attack An Giang Province.

The fleet of Prince Isaret and Chuang Bunnag arrived at Phú Quốc Island in January 1842. Prince Isaret stayed on the island and ordered Chuang Bunnag to attack Hà Tiên. Chuang Bunnag led the Siamese brigantines to attack Hà Tiên and sent a Cambodian force to take Cô Tô Mountain on March 10, 1842. The Siamese artillery shelled Hà Tiên intensely. Đoàn Văn Sách, the defender of Hà Tiên, reinforced the city, which did not fall. After a whole week of attacks, Chuang Bunnag was still unable to take Hà Tiên. Chuang then visited Prince Isaret at Phú Quốc, who decided to retreat on March 26 because of the overwhelming Vietnamese numbers and the unfavorable winds. The Vietnamese had defended against the Siamese in the Siege of Hà Tiên. Nguyễn Tri Phương led the Vietnamese forces to defeat the Siamese-Khmer army at the Battle of Cô Tô. Prince Isaret and Chuang Bunnag then led the Siamese forces to return to Chanthaburi.

An Giang front 
On the An Giang Front, Chao Phraya Yommaraj Bunnak and Prince Ang Duong had commanded some 12,000 Siamese troops in January 1842 to take the Vĩnh Tế Canal and An Giang Province and penetrated into Hậu Giang. Nguyễn Công Nhân was unable to repel the Siamese attacks, and Thiệu Trị sent Tôn Thất Nghị with reinforcements. Phạm Văn Điển, the governor of the An Giang and Hà Tiên Provinces, had joined to defend An Giang but died of illness in April 1842.

In April, the Vietnamese launched an counterattack which pushed the Siamese forces back. Chao Phraya Yommaraj Bunnak and the Siamese were defeated at Châu Đốc on April 8, 1842, suffering heavy losses, and retreated to Phnom Penh. About 1,200 Thai and 2,000 Cambodian soldiers of the Siamese army were killed. Nine Cambodian Oknha noblemen were killed. Yommaraj himself was wounded and one of his son died, and the Vietnamese stopped the pursuit. Nguyễn Công Nhân was made new governor of An Giang and Hà Tiên Provinces.

Interbellum (1842–1845)
Famine and diseases ravaged Cambodia from 1842 to 1843, and the war came to a halt since both warring parties had been exhausted of manpower and resources.

Prince Ang Duong and his guardian Phra Phromborrirak took position at Oudong and were supported by Bodindecha at Battambang. Vietnamese emperor Thiệu Trị allowed Cambodian royalties Ang Em, Ang Mey, other princesses and Cambodian nobles including Tolaha Long to return to Cambodia. They came from Huế and joined Nguyễn Tri Phương at Châu Đốc. However, Prince Ang Em died in March 1843 and left only Princess Ang Mey under Vietnamese control. Bodindecha returned to Bangkok in 1845, along with him Chauvea Tolaha Prom the new Cambodian Prime Minister went to Bangkok to offer tributes from Ang Duong to King Rama III.

Vietnamese offensives of 1845
The Siamese campaigns of 1841 had failed to bring about lasting peace but greatly devastated and depopulated large areas of central, south, and southeastern Cambodia, which antagonized many Cambodians. As soon as Bodindecha had returned to Siam, in 1845, several noblemen in Prince Ang Duong's court at Oudong expressed their desire to seek an allegiance with Vietnam rather than Siam. In May 1845, a group of eighteen Cambodian Oknha noblemen, led by Oknha Chakrey Mei, plotted to overthrow Ang Duong in favor of Ang Mey. However, the plan was quickly caught by Ang Duong and most of the conspirators including Chakrey Mei were executed with few managed to flee. This event stirred up new round of tension between Siam and Vietnam on Cambodia. Upon learning of the abortive plot, Emperor Thiệu Trị launched an offensive into Cambodia in three groups with Võ Văn Giải, the governor of Gia Định Province and Biên Hòa Province as supreme commander;

 Nguyễn Văn Hoàng, the admiral of An Giang, led a Vietnamese fleet from Tân Châu upstream the Bassac River to attack Ba Phnum. 
 Doãn Uẩn, the commander of An Giang, would proceed through Kampong Trabaek District. Both armies would meet at Ba Phnum and jointly attack Phnom Penh. 
 The fleet, led by Nguyễn Công Nhân from Tây Ninh, would follow and reinforce the first two armies.

After Prince Ang Duong had the outspoken Vietnamese sympathizers at his court executed in May 1845, the armies began to advance in July 1845. Nguyễn Văn Hoàng marched along the Bassac River and, after he had defeated a Cambodian contingent at Preak Sambour, proceeded to Ba Phnum. Doãn Uẩn captured Kampong Trabaek and set up camp at Khsach Sa. Chaophraya Bodindecha left Bangkok on July 25, 1845, with his forces and hurriedly marched via Battambang to Oudong to defend the Cambodian royal capital.

Nguyễn Văn Hoàng and Doãn Uẩn converged at Ba Phnum. Võ Văn Giải arrived from Saigon at Ba Phum to command forces and Nguyễn Tri Phương led reinforcement troops from Châu Đốc to Ba Phnum. Nguyễn Tri Phương and Doãn Uẩn attacked Phnom Penh in September 1845. Phnom Penh was defended by Phra Phromborrirak, Bodindecha's son and 5,000 Siamese troops. Taking advantage of high-water inundation surrounding the city, Nguyễn Tri Phương managed to capture Phnom Penh with his fleet on September 11, 1845, and the Thai suffered 600 killed while 1,400 Cambodians were killed. Phra Phromborrirak and the Siamese forces retreated to Oudong. Ang Mei and other Cambodian princesses including Ang Duong's mother were moved from Châu Đốc to Phnom Penh to rally the Cambodians on Vietnamese side.

Nguyễn Văn Chương led about 20,000 Vietnamese troops and 1,000 warships, divided into many smaller forces, expecting to attack and besiege Oudong from all directions, which was defended by Bodindecha and Duong. Meanwhile, Thieu Tri escorted Queen Mey and the Cambodian regalia back to Phnom Penh, planning in order to gain support from the Cambodian population. Nguyễn Tri Phương was stationing at Ponhea Leu, south of Oudong, and Doãn Uẩn was stationing at Kampong Luong, to the north.

The Vietnamese commander, Chương, suddenly fell very ill as the Vietnamese captured the port of Kampong Luong on the Tonle Sap River in October. Therefore, he ordered the army to retreat and cancel the campaign. Other units began panicking and being demoralized, and the Thai attacked them in Kampong Luong, taking many casualties and prisoners. After five months, Nguyễn Tri Phương and Doãn Uẩn lifted the siege and returned to Phnom Penh in November 1845. In December, after some further minor clashes between Siamese-Cambodian forces with the Vietnamese command post in Kampong Luong, both sides agreed to negotiate. Doãn Uẩn requested for Prince Ang Duong to send a mission to Huế, to apologize, and to submit to Vietnamese rule.

Aftermath
The Vietnamese had to send repeated letters to Ang Duong at Oudong, urging him to submit to Vietnamese rule, and promise to return the Cambodian royal hostages, including Ang Duong's mother. However, Prince Ang Duong and Bodindecha remained silent. Only after the Vietnamese had sent an ultimatum in October 1846 was an agreement finally reached in January 1847. King Rama III granted Chaophraya Bodindecha permission to negotiate for peace terms by himself on behalf of Siamese royal court. Prince Ang Duong would be crowned King, and tributes would be submitted to both courts at Bangkok and Huế. The Cambodian courtiers and princesses returned to Oudong.

Prince Ang Doung sent a mission to bring letters to Emperor Thiệu Trị at Huế, who invested him as King of Cambodia in May 1847. Thiệu Trị sent reciprocal mission to invest Ang Duong as Cao Miên Quốc vương or 'King of Cambodia' with a seal. Ang Doung concurrently sent another mission to Bangkok. On January 19, 1848, King Rama III also officially invested Ang Duong as King of Cambodia. King Rama III sent Phraya Phetphichai (formerly Phraya Ratchanikul) to bring royal regalia for coronation of Ang Duong under Siamese superivision. King Ang Duong chose Oudong as his royal seat, naming it as Oudong Meanchey or 'Oudong the Victorious', which would remain the Cambodian capital until 1866. The Vietnamese withdrew their forces from Cambodia in mid-1847 and Siam did the same in April 1848, ending centuries-long Siamese-Vietnamese conflicts over Cambodia. Also in 1848, Phra Phromborrirak escorted Prince Ang Voddey, eldest son of Ang Duong, to Bangkok to live and grow up there.

Later, in 1858, a Vietnamese ship along with twenty one crew was blown off course and landed in Bangkok. The Siamese court under King Mongkut then arranged the Vietnamese crew to board a Chinese ship to return to Saigon. Nguyễn Tri Phương, who was then the superintendent of six provinces in Cochinchina, sent a formal letter to Chao Phraya Sri Suriyawongse asking for the return of Vietnamese captives from the war ten years earlier. Sri Suriyawongse replied that those Vietnamese were already settled down in Siam and he instead returned the seized muskets and ammunition to Nguyễn Tri Phương.

When King Ang Duong of Cambodia died in 1860, a succession dispute arose between his three sons: Norodom, Sisowath and Si Votha, leading to a civil war in Cambodia in 1861. King Mongkut then sent Siamese officials to placate the Cambodian succession dispute, reaffirming Siamese influence over Cambodia until the formation of French protectorate of Cambodia in 1863. The Vietnamese, being engaged in the war with the French, did not intervene.

The peace that had ended the war lasted until the French colonial empire established the French protectorate of Cambodia in 1863.

See also
 Siamese–Vietnamese War (1831–1834)
 Cambodian rebellion (1840)

References

Further reading 
 
 
 Economic Equality and Victory in War: An Empirical Investigation
 1825–1849
 Trần Trọng Kim, Việt Nam sử lược, Nxb Tân Việt, Sài Gòn, 1964
 Sơn Nam, Lịch sử An Giang, NXB Tổng hợp An Giang, 1988.
 Sơn Nam, Lịch sử khẩn hoang Miền Nam. Nxb Văn nghệ TP. HCM, 1994.
 Phạm Văn Sơn, Việt sử tân biên, Quyển 4.  Tủ sách Sử học Việt Nam, sài Gòn, 1961.
 Hoàng Văn Lân & Ngô Thị Chính, Lịch sử Việt Nam (1858– cuối XIX), Q. 3, Tập 2. Nxb Giáo dục, 1979.
 Phạm Việt Trung – Nguyễn Xuân Kỳ – Đỗ Văn Nhung, Lịch sử Campuchia''. Nxb Đại học và Trung học chuyên nghiệp, 1981.
 

Wars involving Cambodia
Wars involving the Rattanakosin Kingdom
Wars involving Vietnam
1840s conflicts
1840s in Siam
19th century in Cambodia
1840s in Asia
1840s in Vietnam
Thailand–Vietnam military relations
Invasions of Cambodia
Military history of Cambodia
Military history of Thailand
Military history of Nguyen Vietnam
19th-century military history of Thailand